Muhammad Nari is a town and union council in Charsadda District of Khyber-Pakhtunkhwa. It is located at 34°14'4N 71°50'20E and has an altitude of 318 metres (1046 feet).

References

Union councils of Charsadda District
Populated places in Charsadda District, Pakistan